Raghunathpur may refer to the following places:

India
 Raghunathpur, Aurangabad, Bihar
 Raghunathpur, Buxar, Bihar
 Raghunathpur, Siwan, Bihar
 Raghunathpur, Siwan (Vidhan Sabha constituency)
 Raghunathpur, Jagatsinghpur district, Odisha
 Raghunathpur railway station
 Raghunathpur, Uttar Pradesh, in Ghaziabad district
 Raghunathpur, Raebareli, Uttar Pradesh
 Raghunathpur, Unnao, Uttar Pradesh
 Raghunathpur, Chanditala-I, Hooghly district, West Bengal
 Raghunathpur, West Bengal
 Raghunathpur (PS-Dankuni), Hooghly district, West Bengal
 Raghunathpur (PS-Magra), Hooghly district, West Bengal
 Raghunathpur, Purulia, West Bengal
 Raghunathpur subdivision
 Raghunathpur I, a community development block
 Raghunathpur II, a community development block
 Raghunathpur, Purulia (Vidhan Sabha constituency) in West Bengal

Bangladesh
 Raghunathpur, Pirojpur District

Nepal
Raghunathpur, Bara
Raghunathpur, Dhanusha
Raghunathpur, Mahottari
Raghunathpur, Rautahat

See also

 Raghunathpura, Rajasthan